1830s fashion in Western and Western-influenced fashion is characterized by an emphasis on breadth, initially at the shoulder and later in the hips, in contrast to the narrower silhouettes that had predominated between 1800 and 1820.

Women's costume featured larger sleeves than were worn in any period before or since, which were accompanied by elaborate hairstyles and large hats.

The final months of the 1830s saw the proliferation of a revolutionary new technology—photography.  Hence, the infant industry of photographic portraiture preserved for history a few rare, but invaluable, first images of human beings—and therefore also preserved our earliest, live peek into "fashion in action"—and its impact on everyday life and society as a whole.

General trends
The prevalent trend of Romanticism from the 1820s through the mid-1840s, with its emphasis on strong emotion as a source of aesthetic experience and its recognition of the picturesque, was reflected in fashion as in other arts. Items of historical dress including neck ruffs, ferronnières (jeweled headbands worn across the forehead), and sleeves based on styles of earlier periods were popular.

Innovations in roller printing on textiles introduced new dress fabrics.  Rich colors such as the Turkey red of the 1820s were still found, but delicate floral prints on light backgrounds were increasingly popular.  More precise printing eliminated the need for dark outlines on printed designs, and new green dyes appeared in patterns of grasses, ferns, and unusual florals.  Combinations of florals and stripes were fashionable.

Overall, both men's and women's fashion showed width at the shoulder above a tiny waist.  Men's coats were padded in the shoulders and across the chest, while women's shoulders sloped to huge sleeves.

Women's fashions

Overview
In the 1830s, fashionable women's clothing styles had distinctive large 'leg of mutton' or gigot sleeves, above large full conical skirts, ideally with a narrow, low waist, achieved through a combination of corsetry to restrict the waist and full sleeves and skirts that made the waist appear smaller by comparison. Heavy stiff fabrics such as brocades were fashionable after the aesthetic simplicity of fashion from 1795 to 1820, and many 18th-century gowns were cut up into new garments. There was an emphasis on sloping shoulders and large, full sleeves over much of the arm, with a small cuff at the wrist, which are distinctive to day dresses of the 1830s.

Pelerines, tippets, or lace coverings draped over the shoulders, were popular (one of several garments, along with full upper-arm sleeves and wide necklines, to emphasize the shoulders and their width).

Gowns
The fashionable feminine figure, with its sloping shoulders, rounded bust, narrow waist and full hips, was emphasized in various ways with the cut and trim of gowns.  To about 1835, the small waist was accentuated with a wide belt (a fashion continuing from the 1820s).  Later the waist and midriff were unbelted but cut close to the body, and the bodice began to taper to a small point at the front waist.   The fashionable corset now had gores to individually cup the breasts, and the bodice was styled to emphasize this shape.

Gowns had very wide necklines and short, puffed sleeves reaching to the elbow from a dropped shoulder, and were worn with mid-length gloves.  The width at the shoulder was often emphasized by gathered or pleated panels of fabric arranged horizontally over the bust and around the shoulders.

Morning dresses generally had high necklines, and shoulder width was emphasized with tippets or wide collars that rested on the gigot sleeves.  Summer afternoon dresses might have wide, low necklines similar to gowns, but with long sleeves.  Skirts were pleated into the waistband of the bodice, and held out with starched petticoats of linen or cotton.

Prior to 1835, fashionable skirts could be worn at ankle-length, but as the decade continued this fell out of fashion.

Hairstyles and Headgear

Early 1830s hair was parted in the center and dressed in elaborate curls, loops and knots extending out to both sides and up from the crown of the head. Braids were fashionable, and were likewise looped over either ear and gathered into a topknot.

Bonnets with wide semicircular brims framed the face for street wear, and were heavily decorated with trim, ribbons, and feathers.

Married women wore a linen or cotton cap for daywear, trimmed with lace, ribbon, and frills, and tied under the chin. The cap was worn alone indoors and under the bonnet for street wear.

For evening wear, hair ornaments including combs, ribbons, flowers, and jewels were worn; other options included berets and turbans.

Undergarments

Women's undergarments consisted of a knee-length linen chemise with straight, elbow length sleeves. Corsets compressed the waist and skirts were held in shape by layers of starched petticoats, stiffened with tucks and cording.  The full sleeves were supported by down-filled sleeve plumpers.

Outerwear
Riding habits consisted of a high-necked, tight-waisted jacket with the fashionable dropped shoulder and huge gigot sleeves, worn over a tall-collared shirt or chemisette, with a long matching petticoat or skirt.  Tall top hats with veils were worn.

Shawls were worn with short-sleeved evening gowns early in the decade, but they were not suited to the wide gigot sleeves of the mid-1830s.

Full-length mantles were worn to about 1836, when mantles became shorter.  A mantlet or shawl-mantlet was a shaped garment like a cross between a shawl and a mantle, with points hanging down in front.  The burnous was a three-quarter length mantle with a hood, named after the similar garment of Arabia.  The paletot was knee-length, with three cape-collars and slits for the arms, and the pardessus was half or three-quarter length coat with a defined waist and sleeves.

For evening, voluminous mantles of velvet or satin, with fur trim or fur linings in cold climates, were worn with the gown.

Footwear

Low, square-toed slippers were made of fabric or leather for daytime and of satin for evening wear. Low boots with elastic insets appeared in this decade.

Style gallery 1830–1835

Fashion plate from Mercure des Salons
Sophie Guillemette, Grand Duchess of Baden wears a white gown that just skims her ankles and a tawny-colored shawl.  Her flat shoes have ribbon laces and square toes. 1831.
Therese von Schenk wears long sheer oversleeves over short puffed sleeves and an elaborate fabric-covered hat with plumes, 1831.
Lucia Carranza de Rodríguez Orey, elite woman from Buenos Aires, wears a peinetón (derived from the Spanish peineta) and a pale dress with large sleeves, a small waist and a leather cord around her neck.
Manuela Suárez Lastra de Garmendia, elite woman from Buenos Aires, wears a gown with gigot sleeves and a small waist, multiple jewelry and an elaborate hairstyle.
Mrs. Edward Kellogg wears the frilled indoor day cap of a married woman with a wide ribbon bow tied under her chin.  Her simple dark gown has gigot sleeves and a modestly broad neckline, filled in with a ruffed chemisette.
Fashion plate from Wiener Moden, in which anatomical accuracy gives way to the desire to present a trendy fashion silhouette. The day dress has a wide, low neckline and long sleeves.
German fashion of 1834 with echoes of the Renaissance: a wide-necked black gown features a tight belt at the raised waistline.  Hair is worn in elaborate curls and knots.
Caroline, Countess of Holnstein wears her hair severely parted in the center front and across the top of her head.  Her long hair is braided, and the braids are looped over either ear and wound into a knot at the crown of her head.  She wears a white gown with a wide belt and gathers at the front to emphasise the bust under a pink satin coat with a fur collar and fur trim.  German, 1834.
Fashion plate from Wiener Zeitschrift shows the fashion for fabrics printed with combinations of stripes and floral designs.
Eugénia, Duchess of Palmela wears a black gown with short, puffed sleeves and mid-length gloves. Her hair is dressed in elaborate curls and a looped braid is gathered into a topknot.
Isabella Colbran, wife of Gioachino Rossini wears a brown silk dress with puffed sleeves, and low square-toed slippers.
Undergarments, corset, petticoat and dressing gown, ca 1835.

Style gallery 1835–1839

1830s Riding habits with fashionable full sleeves.
Marie Lafont-Porcher's hair is styled in a high knot with wide side-curls; her gauzy gown has a neck ruff and a wide collar, and she wears a fur piece similar to that in the Gazette des Salons fashion plate above, 1835.
Conservative, middle-class fashion: Eliza Clarke Cory Clench wears a white cap with a large striped ribbon bow that contrasts with her bright green dress.  Canada, 1834–36.
Portrait of Ada Lovelace in British court dress.  She wears a red train over a white satin gown. Note her square-toed satin slippers, 1836.
African-American trans woman Mary Jones, 1836.
Viennese fashion plate for February 1837 shows front and back views of the newly fashionable dangling clusters of curls on the sides worn with an ornate knot of hair at the crown.  A headband is worn for evening. The waist is still defined by a wide belt, but it sits lower on the body.
By 1837, fullness was dropping from just off the shoulder to the middle of the arm. The bonnet is smaller than those worn earlier in the decade, and black lace mitts (fingerless gloves) are worn with the white day dress.  Hair is worn in wide clusters of short sausage curls. French.
Mathilde, Gräfin Lynar wears a brown velvet gown with snug shoulders and lower sleeves, and fullness at the middle of the arm.  The waist is darted to fit and comes to a small point in front.  Hair is smoothed above the ears and wound into a braided crown.  German, 1837.
Adélaide d'Orléans wears a heavily decorated straw bonnet over a frilled cap, 1838.
Young woman in riding habit inspired by contemporary men's fashion, 1839.

Caricature gallery

Dresses on display

Fashion plates

New Orleans Fashion

German fashion

Men's fashion

Overview
In this time, men's fashion plates continue to show an ideal silhouette with broad shoulders, and a narrow, tightly cinched waist.

Coats and waistcoats
Frock coats (in French redingotes) increasingly replaced tail coats for informal day wear.  They were calf length, and might be double-breasted. Shoulder emphasis fell lower on the arm; shoulders were sloped and puffed sleeve heads gradually shrank and then disappeared. Waistcoats or vests were single- or double-breasted, with rolled shawl or (later) notched collars, and extremely tight through the waist. Waistcoats were sometimes worn two at time, in contrasting colors. Corsets or corset-like garments were worn by many men to draw in the waistline.  The most fashionable coats had padded shoulders and chests, a feature that disappeared after about 1837.

Trousers
Full-length trousers began to have the modern fly-front closure, replacing the earlier fall-front. Breeches remained a requirement for formal functions at the British court (as they would be throughout the century). Breeches continued to be worn for horseback riding and other country pursuits, especially in Britain, with tall fitted boots.

Outerwear

Cloaks were worn with evening wear. Overcoats with wide sleeves were worn with day wear; these were often called greatcoats.

Hats and hairstyles
The crowns of tall hats were less curvy than in the previous period.  Hair was generally parted to one side.  Curled hair and sideburns remained fashionable, along with moustaches.

Style gallery

1830s fashion plate shows the small, high waist that was the ideal of French fashion in the 1830s. Frock coat (left) and morning coat (right).
Frederik Sødring wears a brocade waistcoat with a high black velvet shawl collar.  The front flap of his fall-front trousers can be seen clearly in this 1832 portrait.  Note the taper of the waistcoat toward the tight waist.
Antoine Julien Meffre-Rouzan of New Orleans painted in Paris, 1833, in evening wear.  The puffs at the shoulder of his coat are smaller than those worn in the 1820s, and his waistcoat has a slight point at the front waist.
1834 portrait of Davy Crockett shows the fashionable dark cravat worn with a wide turn-over collar.
Portrait of John C. Calhoun in a sheer white formal cravat, dark coat, and fur-collared or lined overcoat, 1834.
Portrait of Hans Christian Andersen shows the depth and breadth of fashionable coat collars, 1836.
A gentleman of the Wilkes Family, 1838–40, wears a dark cravat.  His tall coat collar is notched and spreads onto his shoulders.  The sleeve has just a hint of fullness at the sleeve head.
Zoo proprietor Edward Cross wears a red and black patterned waistcoat with brown trousers and a black tailcoat, cravat, and top hat, 1838.

Children's fashion
In this period, small boys wore sashed tunics over trousers, sometimes with a round-collared shirt underneath. By the 1830s the skeleton suit had fallen out of fashion. Older boys wore short jackets and trousers with round-collared shirts.

Girls wore simplified versions of women's fashion.

Photographs

See also
Victorian fashion

Notes

References
 Ashelford, Jane: The Art of Dress: Clothing and Society 1500–1914, Abrams, 1996. 
 Goldthorpe, Caroline: From Queen to Empress: Victorian Dress 1837–1877, Metropolitan Museum of Art, New York, 1988,  (full text available online from the Metropolitan Museum of Art Digital Collections)
Payne, Blanche: History of Costume from the Ancient Egyptians to the Twentieth Century, Harper & Row, 1965. No ISBN for this edition; ASIN B0006BMNFS
 Takeda, Sharon Sadako, and Kaye Durland Spilker: Fashioning Fashion: European Dress in Detail, 1700 - 1915, LACMA/Prestel USA 2010, 
 Tortora, Phyllis and Keith Eubank: Survey of Historic Costume, second edition, Fairchild 1994 
 Tozer, Jane and Sarah Levitt, Fabric of Society: A Century of People and their Clothes 1770–1870, Laura Ashley Press,

External links
1830s Fashion Plates of men, women, and children's fashion from The Metropolitan Museum of Art Libraries
The Romantic Era: Fashions 1825-1845
1840s Men's Fashions – c. 1840 Men's Fashion Photos (Daguerreotypes) with Annotations
Men's fashion plates of the 1830s at Victoriana.com
1830s Fashions in the Staten Island Historical Society Online Collections Database 

 
History of clothing (Western fashion)